Jacob Preston (born 11 October 2001) is an Australian professional rugby league footballer who plays as a er  for the Canterbury-Bankstown Bulldogs in the NRL.

Background
Preston was born in Wahroonga, New South Wales. He played his junior rugby league for the Belrose Eagles.

Playing career
In 2021 and 2022, Preston played for the Sydney Roosters in the Jersey Flegg Cup.

In 2023, Preston joined the Canterbury Bulldogs. Preston made his first grade debut from the bench in his side's 31−6 loss to the Manly Sea Eagles at Brookvale Oval in round 1 of the 2023 season. Preston scored his first career try in his side's 26−12 victory over the Melbourne Storm at AAMI Park the following week.

References

External links
Canterbury Bulldogs profile

2001 births
Australian rugby league players
Rugby league second-rows
Canterbury-Bankstown Bulldogs players
Rugby league
Living people